Lathwell is a surname. Notable people with the surname include:

 Mark Lathwell (born 1971), English cricketer
 Richard H. Lathwell, computer scientist